Brendan Green (born November 4, 1986) is a Canadian biathlete and cross-country skier. He began skiing at three years of age and began competition under coach Pat Bobinski. He won Biathlon Canada's Myriam Bedard Award. Brendan competed for Canada in the Biathlon Men's 4x7.5 km Relay at the 2010 Winter Olympics. The group placed 10th.

Career

2018 Winter Olympics
In January 2018, Green was named to Canada's 2018 Olympic team.

References

1986 births
Living people
Olympic biathletes of Canada
Biathlon World Championships medalists
Biathletes at the 2010 Winter Olympics
Biathletes at the 2014 Winter Olympics
Biathletes at the 2018 Winter Olympics
Canadian male biathletes